Pseudo-John is the name given to pseudepigraphical authors who wrote in the name of various early Christian church leaders named John to give their own works greater legitimacy. They include:

Works written in the name of John the Apostle or John the Evangelist:
 The Apocalypse of Pseudo-John, a pseudo-prophetic text based on the Book of Daniel 10.1-12.13,45 concerning the end of time.
 Liber de Dormitione Mariae, an apocryphal narrative of the death of Mary (5th or 6th century)
Works written in the name of John of Damascus, called Pseudo-John of Damascus, Pseudo-John Damascene or Pseudo-Damascene:
Epistula ad Theophilum imperatorem de sanctis et venerandis imaginibus
Sacra parallela
Works written in the name of John Chrysostom, called Pseudo-Chrysostom:
 Opus Imperfectum in Matthaeum, comments on the Gospel of Matthew ostensibly collected from secondary manuscripts.
 The Encomium of John the Baptist, an apocryphal hagiography of John the Baptist.

The name 'Pseudo-John' is not used for the authors of the Johannine works (the Gospel of John, the Epistles of John, and the Book of Revelation). The authors of some of these texts give their name as John, but did not write in the name of someone else.

References 

Pseudepigraphy
New Testament apocrypha